The Florian theory of Shakespeare authorship holds that the Protestant pastor Michelangelo Florio (1515–1566) or his son the English lexicographer John Florio (1552–1625), or both, wrote the plays of William Shakespeare (1564–1616). First thought up in 1927, the idea placed both Florios among the over 80 alternative candidates proposed since mid-19th century as the secret authors of the works of Shakespeare. The intertextual relations between the respective works of John Florio and Shakespeare have been intensely investigated by scholarship but, at the same time, have given rise to 'persistent pseudo-scholarly' attempts, among others by writers Santi Paladino and Lamberto Tassinari, to establish a covert connection between them and affirm they are one and the same person. Scores of works of "biographism", proposing different candidates and using similar arguments, have emerged since the mid 19th-century to question Shakespeare's authorship, but no one in his own time entertained any doubts that he was the author of his works.

Early history
An early outline of this variant of the Shakespeare authorship question, which has never gained much traction outside Italy, was first proposed by Santi Paladino, a Sicilian journalist. According to Shakespearean scholar Frank W. Wadsworth, the idea came to Paladino in 1925 while he brooded over a fortune-teller's prediction that he was destined to startle the world with an "important revelation". Paladino recalled later how one day in his father's library he stumbled across a copy of a book, Second Fruits, that he claimed had been published in 1549 by "Michael Agnolo Florio". In it he found words and phrases that he thought were repeated verbatim in William Shakespeare's works, even though Shakespeare had only begun to publish nearly a half a century later.

In 1927 he ventured to publish this notion in an article entitled "Il grande tragico Shakespeare sarebbe italiano". Entire verses of Hamlet, he claimed, were evidenced in Florio's Second Fruits, and rather than plagiarism, he concluded that this Florio and Shakespeare were one and the same person.

Paladino subsequently expanded on his original article by issuing a small volume, Il grande tragico Shakespeare sarebbe italiano. Michelangelo Florio, he argued,  composed the works but kept them secret, until his son, John Florio, crossed paths with the young Shakespeare. His son did the work of translating his father's oeuvre, the English actor became a front for placing them with theatrical companies, and the father pocketed the profits. The son also appropriated some of his father's writings in the process. From the very outset, scholars dismissed Paladino's speculations as pure folklore.

By 1929 Paladino had established an Accademia Shakespeariana in Reggio Calabria which, according to a correspondent for the London Times, engaged in polemics with both the national and foreign press over the issue. The article and book are often contextualized  within  Italian, or perhaps even Sicilian, nationalism and fascism, where the Roman and Italian figures in Shakespeare's works played a minor, but notable, role in the cultural politics of fascism itself. In 1930, apparently concerned with the negative impact Paladino's polemics might have on Italy's relations with England, at a time when it was trying to secure English support, the fascist government cracked down on Paladino's activities, banning the publication of his work and confiscating his materials.

In 1936 a medium, Luigi Bellotti, said in an interview with La Stampa di Sera that he had been in contact through a séance with the real Shakespeare, during which  pieces of parchment materialized consisting of an autobiography of Michele Agnolo Florio/Guglielmo Crollalanza signed William Shakespeare.  It was this Bellotti who sent into circulation the idea that there was a link between Florio and Crollalanza. This Guglielmo Crollalanza was said to be born in Sondrio and, orphaned at 19, changed his name to Florio to avoid the Inquisition and then joined relatives in England who had in the meantime changed their name to Shakespeare.   Several years later he wrote up the results of his spiritualistic encounters with the real, Italian author in a pamphlet published in Venice in 1943, entitled L’italianità di Shakespeare. Guglielmo Crollalanza grande genio italiano ("The italianness of Shakespeare: Guglielmo Crollalanza great Italian genius").

Foreign reactions
Paladino's 1927 article had an immediate echo abroad when it was picked up by German writer Erik Reger in a review, "Der Italiener Shakespeare" (The Italian Shakespeare), published in the Deutsche Allgemeine Zeitung that same year. Reger identified the 'real' Shakespeare as Michelagnolo Florio.

An English allusion to the controversy was made in 1934, when Frances Yates published her pathfinding book on John Florio. There she briefly dismissed Santi Paladino's remarks as "astonishing", noting that he confuses Michelangelo Florio, whom he assumes is Shakespeare, with his son John. Paladino also asserted, she adds, that Florio the elder had been in Spain, Austria, Athens, the French court and Denmark, without providing any evidence. There might, she allowed, be a grain of truth in some of these claims about his early travels. As to a possible Shakespeare—Florio connection, Yates recognised that Shakespeare had been an attentive reader of the younger Florio and concluded that Shakespeare lived and worked in circles close to the targets of Florio's "angry quill", that Florio sided with Jonson against Shakespeare in the War of the Theatres and that Shakespeare, notwithstanding his deep debts to Florio's translation of Montaigne, may have satirised him partially in the otherwise typical commedia dell'arte figure of the schoolmaster Holofernes in Love's Labour's Lost.

Early postwar revival
Ernesto Grillo (1877–1946), Stevenson Professor of Italian Language and Literature at Glasgow University from 1925 to 1940, made passing reference to Paladino's idea in a posthumous and updated edition of his 1925 study of Shakespeare's relationship with Italy. A revival of his hypothesis began in Italy when Carlo Villa, a journalist, picked up the thread in 1951 with his Paris is well worth a mass! William Shakespeare & the Valtellina poet Michelagnolo Florio, developed further in his Fra Donne e Drammi a decade later (1961). In 1954 some marginal support, again from Germany, came when a Friderico Georgi, identified by Wadsworth as a certain Franz (Maximilian,) Saalbach, in a self-published brochure under the name Erich Gerwien also advocated a Florio theory. This Georgi also claimed that a Florio wrote not only all of Shakespeare, but also, among others, Christopher Marlowe's Dr. Faustus, Thomas Kyd's The Spanish Tragedy, Edmund Spenser's The Faerie Queene, Philip Sidney's An Apology for Poetry and John Lyly's Euphues. Paladino himself, in 1955, published a second book on the topic entitled  "Un italiano autore delle opere shakespeariane"  (An Italian author of the works of Shakespeare.') He too affirmed that Michelangelo Florio, a Calvinist refugee in England and son of Giovanni Florio and Guglielma Crollalanza, had nativized his monicker by making a calque on his mother's name, thus calling himself Guglielmo Crolla-lanza ("William Shake-spear").

In 1979, Guido Scaramellini, a local journalist writing for a provincial newspaper in Sondrio again broached the topic, suggesting that Shakespeare might have been a certain Florio from Valtellina.

Resuscitation in the 2000s

In 2002, Martino Iuvara, a retired high school teacher resident in Ispica, put out a self-published booklet reaffirming the Crollalanza theory, claiming that on Shakespeare's birthday Michel Agnolo Florio was born in Messina to a  doctor Giovanni Florio and his wife, a Sicilian noblewoman, Guglielma Crollolanza. The fact that his name is homonymous with John's father's, is explained as due to this Michelangelo Florio being a younger relative of John Florio's father. After being persecuted for his Calvinist beliefs, he took refuge in England and settled with relatives of his wife, a Crollolanza family in Stratford-on-Avon. It is then hypothesized that he must have adopted their name by translating it into English as 'Shake-spear'. This Michelangelo, he went on to assert, wrote a comedy in Sicilian dialect Troppu trafficu pe' nnenti, for which there is no archival evidence, other than the presumption it must have existed entertained by Santi Paladino, who even dated it to 1579, several decades before the first known comedy in Sicilian made its appearance. Relying on Paladino's claims, Iuvara argued it must be lost and buried in some obscure archive. This imaginary text was apparently then translated by one of the Florios into English with, mutatis mutandis, an identical title, i.e., Much Ado About Nothing, a work we know to be Shakespeare's. Andrea Camilleri, author of the Montalbano detective stories, mocked the thesis by translating Shakespeare's actual play back into Sicilian dialect, using the same title invented by Iuvara. According to the archival historian Carla Rossi,  a leading authority on the Florios, Iuvara's theories have absolutely no scientific value.

Iuvara’s reproposal itself was followed up within the decade by several popular divulgations all characterized by a hurried rehashing of the standard authorship suspicions, but also  stirred the interest of Lamberto Tassinari, a retired university teacher of Italian who had taught  at the University of Montreal. In his view, no one need have any particular qualifications to write on Shakespeare, and admits he has come up with no new evidence or manuscripts to back his contentions. He eventually came out with a book that endorsed the Florian theory, which he published with a minor Montreal editing house. The book had a very small print run, and was virtually ignored by scholars. A revised English version, appearing the following year, did receive critical attention from a published authority on alternative Shakespeare theories, who, after paraphrasing its contents, dismissed it as not so much an hypothesis as much as an expression of the author's faith in the conspiracy theory he embraces uncritically.

Paladino's theory enjoyed another revival in 2016 on the occasion of the 4th centennial celebrations of Shakespeare's death. A veritable boom in speculations about a Florio connection broke out, mainly consisting of self-published materials full of sham biographical reconstructions without any evidential basis. The resurgence of fantasies culminated in a fake news report on an online clone of Sky TG24 that Shakespeare's real birth certificate had been discovered in the archives of Stratford-on-Avon, and testified that he was indeed Michelangelo Florio born on 23 April 1564 in Messina.

French reflections
In 2014 French philosopher Marc Goldschmit, director of the Collège international de philosophie, published a study on marrano culture dealing with his hypothesis about the way converted Jews inflected the Christian sociopolitical cultures of Europe.  He found an antecedent to this in Shakespeare, whose The Merchant of Venice, rather than reflecting anti-Semitic attitudes in the manner Shylock was depicted, evinced to the contrary a thorough grasp of Jewish culture. In particular, he concluded, Portia and Bassanio betrayed all of the lineaments of crypto-Jews, in their names and style of argumentation. The author therefore must have had a thorough mastery of sources in Hebrew, such as the Torah and the Talmud.

At a conference on Jacques Derrida, an acquaintance of Goldschmit, the French actor and theatrical director Daniel Mesguich, alerted him to the existence of Tassinari's Florio theory, and, for Goldschmit, the bits of mystery of Shakespeare's intimacy with Jewish scriptures all fell into place: qua John Florio, son of a man whose ancestors had been converts from Judaism, Shakespeare must indeed have been a crypto-Jew and fluent in Hebrew. Tipped off to read the discussion of Tassinari's book on a blog run by his philosophical colleague and expert on Louis Aragon, Daniel Bougnoux, he consulted Bougnoux and contacted Tassinari. Within two years, in January 2016, a French version, updated and revised, of Tassinari's book was published, with support from Bougnoux who published his own reflections on Tassinari's topic three weeks later. Goldschmit himself  claimed support for the theory by citing Jorge Luis Borges, imagining from a remark of the Argentinian writer that he too was not only an anti-Stratfordian, but had intuited that Shakespeare must have been either Jewish or Italian, since his style was marked by hyperbole rather than typically  English understatement. He was, Goldschmit opined, both.

Critical reactions
When the French edition of Tassinari's book came out, Shakespeare scholar François Laroque commented that the book contains nothing new but was old hat, a 'game' going back to Delia Bacon. Pseudo-revelations of this sensationalist type aspire to stir up polemical reactions from practitioners of orthodox scholarship in order to secure their otherwise hackneyed ideas a certain visibility. One should not play into the hands of the pseudo-demystifier (pseudo-démystificateur) of the day. The more informed academics defend Shakespeare, he added, the greater the inadvertent impression is that the 'nasty' establishment of Shakespearean authorities is engaged in a conspiracy to muffle up what a self-styled iconoclastic smasher of their omertà claims he is exposing.

Notes and references

Notes

References

Sources

Further reading 

 

Shakespeare authorship theories